Stephen Trejo (born November 20, 1977 in Mesa, Arizona) is a former National Football League running back/fullback for the Detroit Lions.

College career
Trejo played college football for Arizona State. At Arizona State he played linebacker and finished his career with 88 total tackles and three sacks, while playing in 43 games, over four years.

Professional career
He was signed by the Detroit Lions as an undrafted free agent following the 2001 NFL Draft. During his rookie season in 2001, he made a career-long reception of 20 yards against the Dallas Cowboys on January 6, 2002. Trejo also completed a career-high of three catches for 26 yards on December 2, 2001. His first career catch came against the Green Bay Packers on November 22, 2001. In 2002, Trejo played in all 16 games, making two catches for 13 yards. Trejo served on special teams with 23 tackles for third on the Lions, 5 of those coming at Arizona, on December 8, 2002. In 2003, Trejo played in all 16 games, mostly on special teams, and saw limited action on offense at the end of the season. In 2004, Trejo made his first career start against Green Bay on October 17, 2004.

High school career
Trejo attended Casa Grande High School, in Casa Grande, Arizona. He was an all-state selection as a junior and senior, after he had 178 carries for 1,458 yards and 19 touchdowns. On defense, he had 111 tackles, 6.5 sacks, two interceptions and one fumble recovery.

Personal life
Trejo currently lives in North Scottsdale, Arizona.

External links
 Bio on Lions Website
 Stats at ESPN
 Stats at SI
 Stats at Yahoo

1977 births
Living people
People from Casa Grande, Arizona
Sportspeople from Mesa, Arizona
Players of American football from Arizona
American football running backs
Arizona State Sun Devils football players
Detroit Lions players